The 1976 West Virginia Mountaineers football team represented West Virginia University in the 1976 NCAA Division I football season. It was the Mountaineers' 84th overall season and they competed as an independent. The team was led by head coach Frank Cignetti Sr., in his first year, and played their home games at Mountaineer Field in Morgantown, West Virginia. They finished the season with a record 5–6.

Schedule

Roster

References

West Virginia
West Virginia Mountaineers football seasons
West Virginia Mountaineers football